Let's Stay Here is the ninth album by American singer, pianist and songwriter Oleta Adams, released April 21, 2009 on Koch.

Track listing

External links

2009 albums
Oleta Adams albums